Fodi may refer to:

People
 John Fodi (1944–2009), Hungarian composer and music librarian
 Viktória Fődi (1886–1940), Hungarian criminal

Other
 Festival of Dangerous Ideas